"I've Been Loved by the Best" is a song written by Bob McDill and Paul Harrison, and recorded by American country music artist Don Williams.  It was released in September 1989 as the second single from the album One Good Well.  The song reached number 4 on the Billboard Hot Country Singles & Tracks chart.

Chart performance

References

1989 singles
Don Williams songs
Songs written by Bob McDill
Song recordings produced by Garth Fundis
RCA Records singles
1989 songs